Felicity Gallup (born 26 September 1969) is a retired British badminton player who represented England and Wales in international tournaments. Gallup in her teens gave up the Badminton career for making her future in Modelling in Japan but came back in badminton after few years. She represented Wales in 2002 Commonwealth Games and reached quarterfinals in Women's doubles with Joanne Muggeridge. En route to the quarterfinals, they defeated top-seeded pair from England Ella Miles & Sara Sankey.

Achievements

IBF International 
Women's singles

Women's doubles

References

External links 

1969 births
Living people
People from Surrey
English female badminton players
Welsh female badminton players